Kim Si-hyeon (born August 5, 1999) also known as Sihyeon, is a South Korean singer and host. She is the leader of Everglow under Yuehua Entertainment.

Early life
Kim was born on August 5, 1999, in Bundang-gu, South Korea.

Career

Pre-debut

Kim competed in the first season of Mnet's reality television competition Produce 101 as an individual trainee in 2016. She placed 40th and then signed with Yuehua Entertainment. In 2018, Kim joined the third season of the franchise, Produce 48 alongside future group mate Wang Yiren and Choi Ye-na. Kim placed 27th and was once again eliminated in the third round with Wang Yiren.

2019–present: Debut with Everglow and solo activities

Kim debuted with Everglow on March 18, 2019, Everglow released their first single album, Arrival of Everglow, with the lead single "Bon Bon Chocolat", with their debut showcase.

On February 7, 2020, Kim was chosen as a new MC for SBS MTV's music program "The Show" alongside The Boyz's Juyeon and Kim Min-kyu.

On December 1st, 2020, Kim along with fellow group mate Wang Yiren tested positive for COVID-19.

On May 25th, 2021, it was announced that Kim would be replacing E:U as the leader of Everglow, as E:U stated that she didn't have any strength while being a leader.

Discography

Filmography

Television show

References

External links

1999 births
Living people
People from Seongnam
South Korean female idols
South Korean women pop singers
21st-century South Korean singers
South Korean dance musicians
Produce 101 contestants
21st-century South Korean women singers
Produce 48 contestants